Dharampal Lakra is an Indian politician from Delhi. In February 2020 he was elected to the Seventh Legislative Assembly of Delhi, representing the Mundka constituency. He is a member of the Aam Aadmi Party.

Political career
Lakra was previously a local office bearer of the INC. He quit INC and joined Aam Aadmi Party (AAP) in 2014.

Personal life
Lakra is a businessman from Mundka. He has described himself as an agriculturalist and a member of the Food Corporation of India. In the 2020 legislative assembly election, he was noted as the wealthiest candidate with a declared wealth of Rupees 300 crore.

Electoral performance

References 

Aam Aadmi Party politicians from Delhi
Delhi MLAs 2020–2025
Year of birth missing (living people)
Living people